Peria or Pēria is a locality in Northland, New Zealand. It lies south of Taipa and east of Kaitaia. The area was once known as Oruru Valley.

Wiremu Hoani Taua, who later became the first Maori person to be appointed as the head teacher of a native school, served on the Peria Native School Committee until 1900.

Demographics

Peria had a population of 1,107 at the 2018 New Zealand census, an increase of 156 people (16.4%) since the 2013 census, and an increase of 96 people (9.5%) since the 2006 census. There were 423 households, comprising 585 males and 522 females, giving a sex ratio of 1.12 males per female. The median age was 46.4 years (compared with 37.4 years nationally), with 228 people (20.6%) aged under 15 years, 159 (14.4%) aged 15 to 29, 540 (48.8%) aged 30 to 64, and 177 (16.0%) aged 65 or older.

Ethnicities were 74.3% European/Pākehā, 40.1% Māori, 3.0% Pacific peoples, 2.7% Asian, and 2.7% other ethnicities. People may identify with more than one ethnicity.

The percentage of people born overseas was 14.4, compared with 27.1% nationally.

Of those people who chose to answer the census's question about religious affiliation, 52.3% had no religion, 30.4% were Christian, 4.3% had Māori religious beliefs, 0.5% were Muslim, 1.4% were Buddhist and 2.4% had other religions.

Of those at least 15 years old, 108 (12.3%) people had a bachelor's or higher degree, and 183 (20.8%) people had no formal qualifications. The median income was $19,600, compared with $31,800 nationally. 45 people (5.1%) earned over $70,000 compared to 17.2% nationally. The employment status of those at least 15 was that 324 (36.9%) people were employed full-time, 126 (14.3%) were part-time, and 60 (6.8%) were unemployed.

Education
Peria School is a coeducational full primary (years 1-8) school with a roll of  students as of  The school was established in 1873, It was a native school until 1914.

The local marae, Te Kauhanga, and its meeting house, Te Poho o Ngāti Kahu, are a tribal meeting place for the Ngāti Kahu hapū of Te Paatu ki Pēria.

Notes

External links
 Peria School website

Far North District
Populated places in the Northland Region